F.A. Heydtmann (died September 13, 1858) was captain of the Hamburg America Line’s ill-fated steamer Austria at the time of its sinking on September 13, 1858. As the Steamboat Austria disaster was caused by negligence of the crew, F.A. Heydtmann was ultimately considered responsible for the worst transatlantic steamer disaster of the 19th century, killing 449 passengers and crew. Heydtmann drowned along with his ship.

Previously, Heydtmann captained the transatlantic steamers Elbe (1849-1853), Donau (1853-1854), and Hammonia (1856-1857).

1858 deaths
Year of birth missing
Hamburg America Line